Parknabinnia wedge tomb is a prehistoric wedge tomb located in the Burren area of County Clare, Ireland.

Location
The tomb is located on Roughan Hill in the townland of Parknabinnia, in the parish of Kilnaboy. It is visible from the nearby road, but located on private property. There are a large number of other prehistoric structures on this hill: tombs, house remains and field walls. Creevagh wedge tomb is about 2.3 km away. 

Parknabinnia is one of eighty wedge tombs still extant in Clare. The largest concentration of them is found on Roughan Hill.

Description
The tomb is wedge-shaped in ground plan, with the widest part facing south west towards the setting sun like all tombs of this type. The setting sun is thus thought to have been of special significance to the builders. Two stones closed the entrance of the tomb, one of which may have been removable. 

No wedge tomb in the Burren has so far been excavated, but the Roughan Hill tombs are tentatively dated to 2300 to 2000 BC.

References

External links

 Parknabinnia wedge tomb at the Clare County Library

Archaeological sites in County Clare
Tombs in the Republic of Ireland